The Inflationary Universe is a popular science book by theoretical physicist Alan Guth, first published in 1997. The book explores the theory of inflation, which was first presented by the author in 1979.

Reception

In April 2015, physicist and Nobel laureate Steven Weinberg included The Inflationary Universe in a personal list of "the 13 best science books for the general reader".

See also
 The First Three Minutes

References

Further reading 
 
 
 
 

Popular physics books
Cosmology books
1997 non-fiction books